Langariz (also Romanized as Langarīz and Langrīz; also known as Langār, Langares, Langarīs, Langar Riz) is a village in Negel Rural District, Kalatrazan District, Sanandaj County, Kurdistan Province, Iran. At the 2006 census, its population was 243, in 71 families. The village is populated by Kurds.

References 

Towns and villages in Sanandaj County
Kurdish settlements in Kurdistan Province